TESO was a  hacker group, which originated in Austria. It was active from 1998 to 2004, and during its peak around 2000, it was responsible for a significant share of the exploits on the bugtraq mailing list.

History 

In 1998, Teso was founded, and quickly grew to 6 people, which first met in 1999 at the CCC Camp near Berlin.

By 2000, the group was at its peak, and started speaking on various conferences, wrote articles for Phrack and released security tools and exploits at a very high pace. Some of its exploits only became known after leaking to the community. This included exploits for wu-ftp, apache, and openssh.

2000 First remote vulnerability  in OpenBSD followed by a series of remote exploits against OpenBSD (some co-authored with ADM). Forced OpenBSD to remove the claim from the OpenBSD webpage "7 years without vulnerability".

In September 2001 released comprehensive Format String Research Paper by scut describing uncontrolled format string vulnerabilities.

In 2003, the group informally disbanded, and in 2004 the website went down.

Achievements 
 In 2000, developed hellkit, the first shellcode generator.
 In 2000, wrote TesoGCC, the first format string vulnerability scanner, and the first comprehensive guide on format string exploitation.
 BurnEye team member is widely believed to be one of the first proper ELF executable crypters.

Quotes

Members and name 

The name originally was an acronym of the nicknames of the original founders (typo, edi, stanly), but as many of the most skilled members joined later, this interpretation quickly became meaningless. Teso originally and during its peak was a small and tightly knit group. A full list of members does not appear to exist, but if public sources can be trusted, at least the following members existed:
Abdullah Khann
 caddis
 edi
 halvar
 hendy
 lorian
 
 palmers
 randomizer
 scut, published in September 2001 Exploiting format strings vulnerabilies paper
 smiler
 skyper
 stealth/S.Krahmer
 stanly
 typo aka Paul Bohm
 xdr/mdr
 zip

See also
 Goatse Security
 w00w00 - A rivaling hacking group. Some research and releases were published together with w00w00 members.
 The Hacker's Choice - Some team-teso members joined THC after TESO was disbanded.

References

External links
 Dave Aitel on TESO
 Packetstorm TESO Archive

Hacker groups